Acalypha rhomboidea (common three-seeded mercury, rhombic three-seeded-mercury, rhomboid mercury, copperleaf, rhombic copper-leaf, three-seeded-mercury, ricinelle rhomboide, diamond threeseed mercury; syn. Acalypha urticifolia Raf., Acalypha virginica L. forma intermedia Millsp., Acalypha virginica L. var. rhombifolia Riddell, Acalypha virginica L. var. rhomboidea (Raf.) Cooperr.) is a plant in the spurge family, Euphorbiaceae.

The species name rhomboidea means "diamond-shaped", and describes the leaves.

Description
Common three-seeded mercury is an annual herbaceous plant. The central stem can be either covered with fine white hairs or hairless. There is a tendency for the leaves to cluster near the top of the stem or stems. A conspicuous, slightly ciliate bract with 5–9 lobes is located where the leaf petiole meets the stem. This bract wraps around the inflorescence, which consists of a green cyathium. The cyathium contains minute staminate and pistillate flowers lacking petals. Male flowers terminate the peduncle with capitate clusters. The flowers consists of four tiny golden green upwardly bent sepals, acute to blunt in shape, and many stamens. Female flowers consist of minute green sepals, a hairy tri-locular ovary, and three fringed styles. One seed per locule is produced. There is no floral scent associated with the flowers.

This plant is somewhat unusual in that it has clear sap as opposed to the typically milky sap of other members of Euphorbiaceae.

Acalypha rhomboidea is quite similar to Acalypha virginica.  The two may be distinguished by the number of lobes on the bracts; the latter has 9–15 lobes whereas the former has only 5–9.  Acalypha rhomboidea also resembles young redroot pigweed (Amaranthus retroflexus L.), but may be distinguished from the latter by the flower clusters, bracts, and occasionally bronze-green leaves of the former.

Distribution and habitat
Acalypha rhomboidea is native to Eastern Canada and the Northeastern, Southeastern, and Central United States.

This plant often grows in fertile loam, but it will tolerate gravelly or clay soil as well. It prefers disturbed areas.  Three-seeded mercury can be found growing in moist to mesic black soil prairie, openings or lightly shaded areas of upland and floodplain forest, thickets, seeps, riverbanks and lake shores, limestone glades and bluffs, fields, fence rows, roadside and railroad right-of-ways, vacant lots, and waste areas.

Ecology
The blooming period for this plant is roughly mid-summer until fall frost, and the flowering period lasts for one or more months.

The seeds are an attractive food source for birds such as the mourning dove and greater prairie chicken. Deer are known to browse Acalypha spp.

In crop fields where group 2 herbicides have been repeatedly used, this plant can become a serious and damaging weed.

References

rhomboidea
Flora of Eastern Canada
Flora of the Northeastern United States
Flora of the Great Lakes region (North America)
Flora of the Great Plains (North America)
Flora of the Southeastern United States
Flora of the United States
Taxa named by Constantine Samuel Rafinesque